Psalm 60 is the 60th psalm of the Book of Psalms, beginning in English in the King James Version: "O God, thou hast cast us off, thou hast scattered us". In the slightly different numbering system of the Greek Septuagint version of the Bible and the Latin Vulgate, this psalm is Psalm 59. In Latin, it is known as "Deus reppulisti nos et destruxisti nos". It is addressed "to the chief Musician upon Shushan Eduth", referring to the title of a song, presumably identifying the intended melody, mentioned only here and in Psalm 80, and described as "a Michtam of David, when he strove with Aramnaharaim and with Aramzobah, when Joab returned, and smote of Edom in the valley of salt twelve thousand." The heading text in the Revised Standard Version and the New American Bible Revised Edition refers to Aram-Zobah, whereas in the New King James Version the reference is to Zobah. The psalm has been called a psalm of communal lament.

The psalm forms a regular part of Jewish, Catholic, Lutheran, Anglican and other Protestant liturgies. It has been set to music.

Text

Hebrew Bible version 
Following is the Hebrew text of Psalm 60:

King James Version
 O God, thou hast cast us off, thou hast scattered us, thou hast been displeased; O turn thyself to us again.
 Thou hast made the earth to tremble; thou hast broken it: heal the breaches thereof; for it shaketh.
 Thou hast shewed thy people hard things: thou hast made us to drink the wine of astonishment.
 Thou hast given a banner to them that fear thee, that it may be displayed because of the truth. Selah.
 That thy beloved may be delivered; save with thy right hand, and hear me.
 God hath spoken in his holiness; I will rejoice, I will divide Shechem, and mete out the valley of Succoth.
 Gilead is mine, and Manasseh is mine; Ephraim also is the strength of mine head; Judah is my lawgiver;
 Moab is my washpot; over Edom will I cast out my shoe: Philistia, triumph thou because of me.
 Who will bring me into the strong city? who will lead me into Edom?
 Wilt not thou, O God, which hadst cast us off? and thou, O God, which didst not go out with our armies?
 Give us help from trouble: for vain is the help of man.
 Through God we shall do valiantly: for he it is that shall tread down our enemies.

Geographical imagery
In verse 8, many writers consider "Moab is my washbowl" to refer to the Dead Sea in the vicinity of Moab, and "Upon Edom I will toss my sandal" is viewed as Edom becoming a humble servant, such as a servant who would clean a master's sandals. Commentaries expressing this view include Albert Barnes' Notes on the Bible, Charles Ellicott's Commentary for English Readers and the Cambridge Bible for Schools and Colleges. Psalm 108 also uses the imagery of tossing a sandal upon Edom. Barnes refers to "an allusion in the expression 'I will cast out my shoe', to the custom, when transferring a possession, of throwing down a shoe on the ground as a symbol of occupancy".

Herod was an Idumean, an Edomite, ruling over the Jews in his day. Some commentators, such as Ray Vander Laan in "In the Shadow of Herod", would view this promise pointing to a victory of the Jews over Edom similar to other promises that Esau (the father of the Idumeans) would serve Jacob and ultimately not fulfilled until Christ.

The "Valley of Salt" is also referred to as the "Valley of Saltpits".

Uses

Jewish liturgy
In Jewish liturgy, the psalm is recited on Shushan Purim. Verse 7 is part of the closing paragraph of the Amidah.

Book of Common Prayer
In the Church of England's Book of Common Prayer, this psalm is appointed to be read on the evening of the 11th day of the month.

Other uses
Actor Stephen Fry uses the phrase Moab Is My Washpot for the title of his autobiography covering his early years.

Musical settings 
Heinrich Schütz set Psalm 60 in a metred version in German, "Ach Gott, der du vor dieser Zeit", SWV 157, as part of the Becker Psalter, first published in 1628.

See also
1 Chronicles 18:12

References

External links 

 
 
  in Hebrew and English - Mechon-mamre
 Text of Psalm 60 according to the 1928 Psalter
 For the leader; according to "The Lily of.â€¦" A miktam of David (for teaching) when he fought against Aram-Naharaim and Aram-Zobah; and Joab, coming back, killed twelve thousand Edomites in the Valley of Salt. / O God, you rejected us, broke our defenses; you were angry but now revive us. text and footnotes, usccb.org United States Conference of Catholic Bishops
 Psalm 60 – From Defeat to Victory in God text and detailed commentary, enduringword.com
 Psalm 60:1 introduction and text, biblestudytools.com
 Psalm 60 / Refrain: Restore us again, O God our Saviour. Church of England
 Psalm 60 at biblegateway.com
 Hymns for Psalm 60 hymnary.org

060
Works attributed to David
Philistia